Neap may refer to:

 Neap, a village in Scotland
 Near Earth Asteroid Prospector, a spacecraft
 neap tide, where the tide's range is at its minimum